John Newnham (born 25 October 1942) is a former Australian rules footballer who played with Fitzroy in the VFL.

Originally from Ivanhoe, Newnham was a rover and started his career well. He was Fitzroy's top vote getter in the Brownlow Medal in just his second season and finished runner up in their Best and fairest that year. 

Newnham was a seven time Victorian interstate representative, with games at the 1966 and 1969 Carnivals.

References
Holmesby, Russell and Main, Jim (2007). The Encyclopedia of AFL Footballers. 7th ed. Melbourne: Bas Publishing.

External links

1942 births
Australian rules footballers from Victoria (Australia)
Fitzroy Football Club players
Eltham Football Club players
Ivanhoe Amateurs Football Club players
Living people
People educated at Carey Baptist Grammar School